Monsters and Men is a 2018 American drama film written and directed by Reinaldo Marcus Green. It was screened in the U.S. Dramatic Competition section at the 2018 Sundance Film Festival. It was released on September 28, 2018, by Neon. Although not explicitly stated, the plot shows a similarity with the killing of Eric Garner incident, by which the film was inspired.

Plot
The film is told in three intertwined stories of three principle characters: Manny, Dennis and Zyrick. The film begins with Dennis Williams being pulled over by police but let go because he is a cop himself. The story switches to Manny Ortega trying to apply for a job, but hesitates on the convicted felon section of the application. Manny lives with his family including wife Marisol, mother and daughter. Manny goes out to hang out with some of his friends when a cop rolls up near their dice game. In an incident very similar to Eric Garner's death, six police officers attempt to arrest Darius Larson, a friend of Manny's who sells loose cigarettes outside a small bodega. While unclear what transpires, a cop fires his gun and kills Darius while Manny is recording the entire incident from his phone.

Manny, traumatized by the incident, returns home and rewatches the video. The next day in a newspaper, he sees that cops said Darius was reaching for their gun. While sitting in a park, Manny is confronted by two cops who attempt to intimidate him into not releasing the video. He tells Marisol the truth about the incident and how Darius didn't reach for the gun, but she cautions him to avoid any public disclosure because of his new job. Manny then sees a suspicious black vehicle outside his apartment that leaves when he gets close. Manny checks his apartment to make sure they didn't break in. Not willing to be bullied, he puts his video out on the internet for all to see.

He sees the effects of this video in the press and out on the street. But shortly afterwards, he is arrested by the same cops who tried to intimidate him in the park. During his interrogation, they tried to pin a gun to Manny that they found on his friend Victor. The narrative focus then shifts to Dennis Williams via the interrogation mirrored window.

Dennis goes out on patrol with his partner. Dennis asks Stacey, a white woman, how many times she has been pulled over this year, and she says none, alluding back to the opening scene. Dennis is then seen interacting in a playful yet competitive basketball game with local kids, in particular Zyrick, but it is undercut by the fact they spit on the door handle. Danny and his partner are then called in to calm a protest happening at the bodega where Darius was shot by police. They are met with angry protestors shouting at them. Dennis goes home and watches the video of the incident.

The next day, his partner Stacey brings up that internal affairs is looking into the case of the shooting of Darius Larson, specifically against officer Scala who was involved. Stacey seems dismissive of the entire incident, but Dennis thinks that reform is necessary and Scala is a bad cop. Later at dinner with friends, the incident of the shooting comes up as an item of discussion. Dennis becomes protective of the police as a whole claiming that they risk their lives, meanwhile Lisa argues that a man should not lose his life over a cigarette and that Dennis should be part of the solution to get rid of corrupt police. On his drive into the station, he is told about two officers who were shot and killed on duty. During an internal affairs interview, Dennis does not speak out against officer Scala. Later, on Dennis' night patrol, Zyrick, the boy who was playing basketball with Dennis earlier, is detained by some other officers. While Dennis drives by, the narrative shifts to Zyrick who is visibly scared.

After being released by the cops, Zyrick returns home where he and his father live. The next day we watch Zyrick commute to his private school where he plays baseball. He is told about how recruiting scouts are going to be coming to his upcoming baseball game by his coach. On his way home from school, he sees some cops detaining another young black man on the street. Zyrick comes home and watches the video of Darius Larson getting killed. The next day Zyrick finds Zoe, who Zyrick has seen passing out flyers. Zyrick asks to help out with community activism and Zoe introduces him to the group that is getting ready for a protest against Darius Larson's shooting. A scout comes to recruit Zyrick at his home, but asks him questions about his character, making a lot of racial assumptions in his line of questioning. The scout indicates that Zyrick will be recruited, leading to the father and Zyrick to celebrate after the scout leaves. Later, Zoe and Zyrick then go visit Manny's home. We find out Manny has been arrested, and Marisol is pregnant with another child.

After working out and training, Zyrick hears his teammates talking about the Larson shooting, casually mocking Larson for "reaching for the gun." Zyrick returns home to find a celebration in his honor, but he finds the party overwhelming given the protest scheduled that same night. He walks out of the party, and his father confronts him saying that Zyrick has a ticket given his talent. Zyrick nevertheless joins the protest. During the protest, everyone begins chanting "I am... Darius Larson"  before they sit down and raise their fists peacefully. The cops tell them they will be disbanded by force and soon after the police start using aggressive measures and Zyrick runs away back home. The next day, Zyrick goes to his big game. The final scenes show Zyrick exiting the locker room wearing a t-shirt with the words "I am Darius Larson" that Zoe had given him the day before. As he approaches the field, the chant "I am Darius Larson" is overlaid in the background, before he takes a knee outside and it cuts to black.

Cast
 John David Washington as Dennis Williams
 Anthony Ramos as Manny Ortega
 Kelvin Harrison Jr. as Zyrick
 Rob Morgan as Will Morris
 Chanté Adams as Zoe
 Nicole Beharie as Michelle
 Jasmine Cephas Jones as Marisol Ortega
 Cara Buono as Stacey
 Cassandra Freeman as Lisa
 Angel Bismark Curiel as Joshua

Reception 
On review aggregate website Rotten Tomatoes, Monsters and Men has an approval rating of 83% based on based on 82 reviews, with an average rating of 7.10/10. The website’s critics consensus reads, "Well-acted and visually stylish, Monsters and Men tells its timely story with enough compassion and complexity to make up for occasionally uneven execution." On Metacritic, the film has a score of 68 out of 100 based on 23 reviews, signifying "generally favorable reviews".

See also
List of black films of the 2010s

References

External links
 
 

2018 films
2018 drama films
2018 directorial debut films
2018 independent films
American drama films
Films scored by Kris Bowers
Neon (distributor) films
2010s English-language films
2010s American films
African-American films